El is a crater on Ganymede. It has a small "pit" in its center. Craters with such a "central pit" are common across Ganymede and are especially intriguing since they may reveal secrets about the structure of the satellite's shallow subsurface.

References

Impact craters on Ganymede (moon)